Spiroplasma mirum is a bacterium in the genus Spiroplasma. A strain of it, called Spiroplasma mirum strain SMCA (Suckling mouse cataract agent), causes cataracts in suckling mice.

References

External links
Type strain of Spiroplasma mirum at BacDive -  the Bacterial Diversity Metadatabase

Mollicutes
Bacteria described in 1982